Dioxidanylium, which is protonated molecular oxygen, or just protonated oxygen, is an ion with formula .
It is formed when hydrogen containing substances combust, and exists in the ionosphere, and in plasmas that contain oxygen and hydrogen. Oxidation by O2 in superacids could be by way of the production of protonated molecular oxygen.

It is the conjugate acid of dioxygen. The proton affinity of dioxygen (O2) is 4.4 eV.

Significance
Protonated molecular oxygen is of interest in trying to detect dioxygen in space. Because Earth's atmosphere is full of O2, its spectrum from a space object is impossible to observe from the ground. However  should be much more detectable.

Formation
Reaction of dioxygenyl  with hydrogen:
 + H2 →  + H•

The reaction of the trihydrogen cation with dioxygen is approximately thermoneutral:
O2 +  →  + H2

When atomic hydrogen, created in an electric discharge is rapidly cooled with oxygen and condensed in solid neon, several reactive ions and molecules are produced. This reaction also forms hydrogen peroxide (H2O2) and hydrogen tetroxide (H2O4).

Properties
In the infrared spectrum  the v1 band due to vibrating O–H has a band head at 3016.73 cm−1.

Reactions
A helium complex (He–O2H+) also is known.

 appears to react rapidly with hydrogen:
 + H2 → O2 + 
 also reacts with dinitrogen and water:
 + H2O → O2 + H3O+

Related
The protonated molecular oxygen dimer  has a lower energy than that of protonated molecular oxygen.

References

Reactive oxygen species
Cations
Hydrogen compounds